Khesht is a city in Fars Province, Iran.

Khesht or Khasht may also refer to:
 Khasht, Lamerd, Fars Province
 Khesht, Razavi Khorasan
 Khesht District, in Fars Province
 Khesht Rural District, in Fars Province